Mala, is the twenty-sixth (26th) studio album by Puerto Rican singer Yolandita Monge released by Universal Music Latino after the acquisition of Univision Music.  This album was released on November 25, 2008, and follows the same musical and lyrical style as Demasiado Fuerte and was produced once again by José Luis Pagán.

Puerto Rican singer Yolandita Monge has been releasing albums regularly since the 1970s, moving steadily toward a sleek, commercially friendly Latin pop sound. This goal is fully realized on this album, but as both the title and the forbidding cover imply (the cover art features a dramatic close-up of Monge's mascara-smeared eyes), there is something darker here. Indeed, the songs are mournful and moody, even on the uptempo, cabaret-style title track. For long-time fans, there's no shortage of Monge's usual flair for pop hooks and excellent dramatic delivery.

The album is available as a digital download at iTunes and Amazon.

Reception
The album achieved commercial success in Puerto Rico and some Latin America countries.  A highly stylized music video for the track Mala was filmed and it is also available to download at iTunes.

Track listing

Credits and personnel

Vocals: Yolandita Monge
Executive Producer: Alexis Grullón
Vocal Direction: Jorge Luis Piloto
Arrangements & Musical Direction: José Luis Pagan
Arrangements & Musical Direction ('Una Y Otra Vez', 'Viviré'): José Luis Pagán, Cirilo Rodulfo
Drums: José 'Jota' Morelli
Bass: Guillermo Vadala
Guitars: José Luis Pagán
Keyboards: José Luis Pagán, Cirilo Rodulfo
Chorus: Cynthia Nilson, José Luis Pagán
Percussion: Eduardo Avena

Recorded: Estudios Mobile, Buenos Aires; Ultra Pop Studios, Miami; Rolo Studio, Puerto Rico
Engineers: Gustavo 'Pichón' Dal Pont, Cirilo Rodulfo, Rolando Alejandro
Mixing: José Luis Pagán, Ultra Pop Studios, Miami
Mastering: Mike Couzzi, Mico Mastering Studios, Miami
Creative Direction & Image: Carlos R. Pérez
Graphic Design: Elastic People (Carlos R. Pérez, Kiley Del Valle)
Photography: Mateo García
Hair & Make-up: Fernando Báez
Fashion Stylist: Raquel Ortiz

Notes

Track listing and credits from album booklet.

Radio Remixes

Singles
Mala (2008)
Una y Otra Vez (2009)
Sin Pensarlo (2009)
Sería Lamentable (2010)
Oportunidad Perdida (Feat. Victor Manuelle) (2011)
Oportunidad Perdida (Feat. Anthony Rios) (Radio Only) (2011)

Promotion

Mala... Tour 2009

A tour to promote the album will begin on April 24, 2009 in Santo Domingo, Dominican Republic. Yolandita Monge, will begin her tour in Santo Domingo, Dominican Republic, which will tour several countries in Latin America.

Release history

Charts

Singles charts

References

Yolandita Monge albums
2008 albums
Albums produced by Luny Tunes